Chaleh Pareh (also Romanized as Chāleh Pareh; also known as Chal Pareh) is a village in Zalaqi-ye Sharqi Rural District, Besharat District, Aligudarz County, Lorestan Province, Iran. At the 2006 census, its population was 306, in 53 families, making it the most populous village in the rural district.

References 

Towns and villages in Aligudarz County